Li Shangyin (813858), courtesy name Yishan, was a Chinese poet and politician of the late Tang dynasty, born in the Henei Commandery (now Qinyang, Henan). He is noted for the imagist quality of his poems and his "no title" style of poetry. Li Shangyin has been frequently anthologized, and many of his poems have been translated into various languages, including several collections in English.

Biography
Li Shangyin was born about 812 or 813 CE, but the exact date is uncertain. His career was rough, and he never obtained a high position, either because of factional disputes or because of his association with Liu Fen, a prominent opponent of the eunuchs.

Historical background
Li Shangyin lived at a time when the Tang dynasty was rapidly declining, after some two hundred years of glorious reign.

Culturally, politically, and economically, the Tang was one of the great periods of Chinese history. The cosmopolitan capital of Chang'an was filled with traders from the Middle East and other parts of Asia where many Asian vassal states sent envoys to pay tribute. The empire covered a vast territory, the largest yet in the history of China. Under the reign of Emperors Gaozuyi through Taizong, Empress Wu, and Emperor Xuanzong, the Tang empire steadily grew to the height of its prosperity.

However, after the An Lushan Rebellion, the political and economic structure of the country began to disintegrate. The rebel generals fighting against the Tang court during and after the rebellion were allowed to surrender and given military governor posts, even after the leaders of the rebellion were vanquished. Peace and stability over the entire area of Hebei was heavily bought by a compromise settlement. These provincial governors paid only lip service to the central government. The court, now weak and impotent, tolerated their growing independence, wary also of the aggression of the Tibetans to the north-west who posed a constant threat to the capital.

During the subsequent years, military governors repeatedly challenged imperial authority with attempts to claim hereditary succession, resulting in revolts and bloodshed. Apart from this loss of control over the provincial military leaders and other problems at the frontiers, the Tang court was internally plagued by the increasingly powerful eunuchs and the fierce Niu–Li factional strife.

Rise of the eunuchs 
The eunuchs first gained political influence as a group when Gao Lishi helped Emperor Xuanzong in his rise in power. Later, Li Fuguo also helped to put Emperor Suzong on the throne. By gaining royal patronage, eunuchs gradually controlled personal access to the emperors and participated in the business of the central government. They also involved themselves with provincial appointments, at times, even intervening with armed forces in disputes over imperial successions. By the time of Li Shangyin, the emperors had allowed the eunuchs to become fully entrenched both militarily and politically. After Xianzong, all Tang emperors (except Jingzong) were put on the throne by the eunuchs.

Sweet Dew Incident 
In 835 the infamous "Sweet Dew Incident" occurred during the reign of Emperor Wenzong. A palace coup, designed by Li Xun (the prime minister) and Zheng Zhu (the military governor of Fengxiang) in support of Wenzong's effort to overthrow the eunuchs, failed. The eunuchs, led by Qiu Shiliang, slaughtered the clans of many high officials and chief ministers. Many other innocent people were killed in connection with this event. The eunuchs, whose power had been growing out of control, now completely dominated the Emperor and the affairs of state.

Niu-Li factional strife 
The Niu-Li factional strife was another destructive internal force haunting the Tang court. The Niu and Li factions were not organized political parties, but two groups of rival politicians, hostile toward each other as a result of some personal animosity. The head of the Niu faction was represented by Niu Sengru and Li Zongmin and the Li faction by Li Deyu. In the 830s the two contending factions created much turmoil in court through the reigns of Emperors Muzong, Jingzong, Wenzong, Wuzong, and Xuanzong, a period coinciding almost exactly with Li Shangyin's life. According to Chen Yinke, the struggle was also due to a difference in social background between the two groups, one representing the traditional ruling class of North China, and the other, the newly risen class of scholar-officials who reached their positions through the civil service examinations. In any case, many intellectuals and high officials were involved in this struggle. Whenever members of one faction were in power, people associated with the other faction would be demoted, or out of favor. The factional strife kept court officials from uniting against the increasing power of the eunuchs.

Decline of the eunuchs 
The emperors, rendered completely helpless, tried to play one force against another. It was some fifty years after Li Shangyin's death that the eunuchs were finally eradicated with the help of the military governors, precipitating the downfall of the Tang dynasty. The forty-five years of Li Shangyin's life covered the reign of six emperors. Among them, Xianzong and Jingzong were murdered by the eunuchs. Muzong, Wuzong, and Xuanzong indulged in escapist practices; Wuzong, for example, died of an overdose of elixir drugs.

Works
Li Shangyin is well known for his poetry. In the many published editions of the poetry anthology Three Hundred Tang Poems, the number of Li Shangyin's included poems rank below only Du Fu, Li Bai, and Wang Wei, respectively. However, Li Shangyin's poetry distinguishes itself from mainstream Classical Chinese poetry due to his extensive use of the love of women as a major theme. Li Shangyin's poems are also distinguished by the many collected verses published with no title.

Li was a typical Late Tang poet: his works are sensuous, dense and allusive. The latter quality makes adequate translation extremely difficult. The political, biographical or philosophical implications supposed to be contained in some of his poems have been a subject of debate for many centuries in China.

Although more famous for his sensuous poems, Li indeed wrote in many styles, sometimes satirical, humorous or sentimental. Moreover, some ancient critics hold that he is the only poet who, in some of his poems, succeeds in imitating the masculine quality of Du Fu's works.

Poetic style
Li Shangyin typically wrote his poetry in the various Classical Chinese poetry forms, some of his poems being in the poetic forms whose development is associated with Tang poetry and some which hearkens back to much older forms. The Chinese critical tradition tends to depict Li Shangyin as the Tang dynasty's last great poet. The Tang dynasty ended in 907 CE and, after a period of disunity, was succeeded by the Song dynasty in 960 CE. The Song poetry style, although drawing on the traditional forms, is especially noted for the development of the ci (Wade-Giles: t'zu) form, which was characterized by providing fresh lyrics to fixed-meter tunes and by the inclusion of romantic and even erotic themes, which themes were often viewed as embarrassing by traditional scholars. Li Shangyin's poetry forms an important transitional role as part of this developmental process.

Poems
Some of Li Shangyin's poems are well-known, such as the famous and cryptic poem "Jin Se" (the title is only taken from the first two characters of the poem, since the poem is one of Li's "no title" poems), consisting of 56 characters and a string of images. His "no-title" poems are regarded as "pure poetry" by some modern critics.

Translations
Li Shangyin's poetry has been translated into various languages, including English.

Sample poem

In popular culture 
In 1968, Roger Waters of the rock band Pink Floyd borrowed lines from his poetry to create the lyrics for the song "Set the Controls for the Heart of the Sun" from the band's second album A Saucerful of Secrets.

Part of a poem by Li Shangyin is recited by a minor character in the role-playing video game Planescape: Torment.

More recently, Li Shangyin's poem "When Will I Be Home?" is alluded to and quoted from by the protagonist of Peter Heller's 2012 novel, The Dog Stars. The novel ends with a reprinting of the poem in full.

His name is mentioned, and one of his poems is quoted, in Episode 119 of the Korean TV series 구암 허준.

Notes

References
 Chen, Bohai, "Li Shangyin". Encyclopedia of China (Chinese Literature Edition), 1st ed.
 Bynner, Witter Tang Shi San Bai Shou (300 Tang Poems), Alfred A. Knopf: New York, 1920.
Graham, A. C. (1977). Poems of the Late T'ang. New York, New York: The New York Review of Books. 
Hinton, David (2008). Classical Chinese Poetry: An Anthology. New York: Farrar, Straus, and Giroux.  / 
 Yu, Teresa Yee-Wah. 2011. "Li Shangyin : The Poetry of Allusion." Retrospective Theses and Dissertations, 1919-2007. T, University of British Columbia. .

External links 

 Poems by Li Shang-yin
 Biography, Chinese texts and translations.
 Regulated verses of Li Shangyin, with English translation, pinyin transliteration, and tonal patterns.
 
 
 Books of the Quan Tangshi that include collected poems of Li Shangyin at the Chinese Text Project:
 Book 539
 Book 540
 Book 541
 Li Shangyin's Tang 300 poems at the University of Virginia Library

810s births
858 deaths
9th-century Chinese poets
Poets from Henan
Politicians from Jiaozuo
Tang dynasty politicians from Henan
Three Hundred Tang Poems poets
Writers from Jiaozuo